William Don Parkinson (1942 – August 31, 2020) was an American Veteran and Sergeant of the Vietnam war, politician, and lawyer who served as Speaker of the Guam Legislature from 1995 to 1997 and as Majority Leader from 1989 to 1995. A member of the Democratic Party of Guam, he also served as a Senator for 7 consecutive terms, from 1983 to 1997.

Early life 
  
Parkinson was born in 1942 in Idaho and served in the U.S. military during the Vietnam War. He graduated from the University of Idaho law school.

Law practice 

Parkinson was admitted to the State Bar of California on November 25, 1974, served as a staff attorney for the Micronesian Constitutional Convention of 1975, and as a prosecuting attorney for Colfax, Washington.

Guam Legislature

Elections

Leadership roles

Policy

Bills and public laws introduced
 17th Guam Legislature - Introduced 16 bills, 2 of which became public laws. including Public Law 17-17, which established a 10 year alternative energy plan for Guam.
 18th Guam Legislature - Introduced 21 bills, 1 of which became Public Law 18-26, which approved bond issues on behalf of 2 companies for the Guam Economic Development Authority and for which the Government of Guam disclaimed liability.
 19th Guam Legislature - Introduced 6 public laws, including Public Law 19-31, which raised the minimum wage on Guam to $3.75 on January 1, 1989, and Public Law 19-41 that requires that food, drugs, and consumer commodities be marked with an expiration date if recommended by the manufacturer or distributor.
 20th Guam Legislature - Introduced 73 bills, 15 of which became public laws, including Public Law 20-219 which provided a subsidy for essential power coverage.

Unemployment insurance
Parkinson introduced unemployment insurance legislation during each of 5 terms: Bill 929 during the 19th, Bill 285 during the 20th, Bill 101 during the 21st, Bill 123 during the 22nd, and Bill 99 during the 23rd Guam Legislatures, respectively.

Speaker of the 23rd Guam Legislature
It had been expected that Senator Thomas C. "Tom" Ada would be chosen by his colleagues as Speaker of the Guam Legislature, but a group of Democratic and Republican Senators elected Parkinson as Speaker, instead.

Candidacy for Attorney General of Guam
Parkinson ran for Attorney General of Guam in 2002. He placed 3rd in the general election in November with 15% of the vote.

Personal life and death
Don Parkinson married Marina Parkinson and was the father of 7 children. One of his children, William M. "Will" Parkinson, ran for the Guam Legislature and the Consolidated Commission on Utilities in 2018.

Parkinson was diagnosed with Parkinson’s Disease in the late late 1980's. He died in the Philippines on August 31, 2020.

References

20th-century American politicians
21st-century American politicians
2020 deaths
Guamanian Democrats
Guamanian lawyers
California lawyers
Washington (state) lawyers
Military personnel from Idaho
University of Idaho College of Law alumni
Members of the Legislature of Guam
Speakers of the Legislature of Guam
1942 births